Zakharov v. Russia was a 2015 court case before the European Court of Human Rights involving Roman Zakharov and the Russian Federation. The Court ruled that Russia's legal provisions governing communications surveillance did not provide adequate safeguards against arbitrariness or abuse, and that therefore a violation took place of Article 8 of the European Convention of Human Rights (right to privacy).

Case 
In 2003, editor Roman Zakharov brought judicial proceeding against three mobile network operators, claiming that there had been a violation of his right to the privacy of his communications. He maintained that Russia's SORM system (surveillance equipment installed at mobile phone companies) enables unrestricted interception of all telephone communications by the security services without prior judicial authorization. The claim was rejected on the grounds that Zakharov did not prove to be a victim of such an interception himself. The rejection was upheld in 2006. 

In 2006, Zakharov lodged a case with the ECtHR. He relied on Article 8 (right to privacy), arguing that Russia's national law permitted the security services to intercept, through technical means, any person's communications without obtaining prior judicial authorization. He further relied on Article 13 (right to an effective remedy), complaining that he had no effective legal remedy at national level to challenge that legislation.

Findings 
In a unanimous Grand Chamber decision, the Court ruled that several aspects of Russian surveillance legislation were incompatible with the European Convention on Human Rights:
 Communications surveillance is permitted for a broad range of criminal offenses and authorities have "an almost unlimited degree of discretion" in the matter;
 Surveillance is not limited to those suspected of having committed offenses;
 Criteria for beginning, ceasing and scope of the surveillance are not clearly defined;
 Robust oversight mechanisms and effective remedies were lacking, mainly:
 Logging or recording of the interceptions is prohibited by Russian law; 
 Supervision of interception by judges and prosecutors is limited, does not include checks for necessity and justification, and is not open to public scrutiny; 
 The absence of a requirement to notify the subject when surveillance had ceased undermines the effectiveness of any available remedies
Although Russian law generally provided for prior judicial authorization of communications surveillance, the Court concluded that in practice, this could be circumvented. It also remarked that the proceedings indicate the existence of arbitrary and abusive surveillance practices. 

Russia's SORM system was therefore found to be inconsistent with the requirements of Article 8. The Court held that the existence of the contested legislation amounted to an interference with Zakharov's rights.

Aftermath 
On the same day of the ruling, the Russian government passed a law allowing it to overrule international court orders to "protect the interests of Russia" if these orders are contradictory to the constitutional law.

Commentators have noted the decision for the fact that the applicant was able to challenge the surveillance regulatory framework without being required to prove that he had been spied upon himself. The Court instead considered the legislation in abstracto as well as its application in practice.

The case was featured in Oxfords University Press blog in its 2015 "Top ten developments in international law" list.

See also 
 SORM

References

External links 
 HUDOC Press Release: Arbitrary and abusive secret surveillance of mobile telephone communications in Russia
 Q & A: Roman Zakharov v. Russia, Grand Chamber judgment [ECtHR Press Unit]
 Judgment: CASE OF ROMAN ZAKHAROV v. RUSSIA (Application no. 47143/06)

Article 8 of the European Convention on Human Rights
European Court of Human Rights cases involving Russia
Law enforcement in Russia
Surveillance
2015 in case law
2015 in Russia
European Court of Human Rights cases decided by the Grand Chamber